Johnie Wright Hammond (born August 22, 1932) is an American politician in the state of Iowa.

Hammond was born in Eupora, Mississippi. She attended University of Texas, University of Minnesota, and Iowa State University. A Democrat, she served in the Iowa House of Representatives from 1983 to 1995 (74th district) Iowa Senate from 1995 to 2003. 1st woman in Story County, Iowa to hold office on the county board of supervisors, first woman to represent Ames in the House of Representatives and in the Senate. Reference: Ames Tribune. (31st district).

References

1932 births
Living people
People from Eupora, Mississippi
University of Minnesota alumni
University of Texas alumni
Iowa State University alumni
Businesspeople from Iowa
Women state legislators in Iowa
Democratic Party members of the Iowa House of Representatives
Democratic Party Iowa state senators
21st-century American women